Typhoon Georgia was one of the more impactful typhoons that struck Japan, as well as one of the few observed tropical cyclones that made direct landfall in Russia (then known as Soviet Union) as a tropical storm. A low pressure system formed in the vicinity of Guam on August 10 which formed Tropical Depression Fran, and a new low-level center formed from a fracture of a trough that split newly formed tropical depression in the midnight of August 12. The newly formed low level center was classified as a tropical storm and was named Georgia hours later by the Joint Typhoon Warning Center. The new tropical storm was tracked by Japan Meteorological Agency shortly afterwards and Georgia rapidly intensified into a typhoon. On the next day, Georgia further intensified after passing Chichi Jima and reached peak sustained winds of  while quickly accelerating in the north-northwest direction before striking Chūbu region in Japan on evening of the same day as a weakening typhoon. After emerging on the Sea of Japan as a tropical storm on August 14, Georgia made landfall in Soviet Union as a tropical storm at the afternoon of the same day, before transforming into an extratropical storm quickly after landfall. Remnants of Georgia was last noted on Heilongjiang, China on August 16.

Georgia caused destruction throughout Central Japan. Nagano and Yamanashi prefectures were the hardest hit from the typhoon, as the rains from the typhoon caused enormous damages, which was worsened by Typhoon Ellen from days earlier. Georgia left more than 50,000 families homeless, tore down miles of communication lines, and washed out bridges and roads. Georgia also caused the worst damage on railway transport network in Japan's history at the time. 4,089 houses were destroyed and 10,139 others were damaged. Because of the storm, 188 people were killed, 47 people were reported missing and 1,528 people were injured. Combined with damages from Typhoon Ellen, damages from Typhoon Georgia totaled $50 million (1959 USD).

Meteorological history

An ill-defined low pressure system formed in the vicinity of Guam on 10 August, which spawned Tropical Depression Fran. A reconnaissance aircraft flew into newly formed Fran on 11 August. On the early next day, Fran split into two low level centers, which was induced by the fracture of an upper-air polar trough. The new center became the predominant circulation and caused Fran to quickly dissipate on the next day.

Georgia quickly traversed through the prefectures of Shizuoka, Yamanashi, Nagano and Niigata on the same night. On the midnight of the next day, Georgia emerged in the Sea of Japan through the vicinity of Jōetsu, Niigata as it weakened into a tropical storm. After crossing the Sea of Japan, Georgia made landfall as a tropical storm near Preobrazheniye, Primorsky Krai, Soviet Union at 15:00 UTC on the same day. After making landfall for the second time in Soviet Union, Georgia quickly transformed into a weak extratropical cyclone. The extratropical remnants of Georgia was last noted to be in Heilongjiang, China on August 16.

Impact and aftermath
In Gifu Prefecture, Makita River was flooded by rains from Georgia. In Nagano and Yamanashi prefectures, damages caused by collapsing houses, falling trees were enormous. Damages left from Typhoon Ellen were worsened by Georgia in these prefectures. According National Rural Police, 48 people were dead and 51 were reported missing in Nagano and on Yamanashi 40 people were dead and 57 were reported missing.

In overall, Georgia left more than 50,000 families homeless, tore down miles of communication lines, and washed out bridges and roads. Georgia also caused the worst damage on railway transport network in Japan's history at the time. According to reports from JMA, Georgia destroyed 4,089 homes and damaged 10,139 others. Georgia also caused deaths of 188 people, 47 were reported missing and injured 1,528 people.

Because of the impact inflicted by this typhoon and Typhoon Vera after a month later, these typhoons are considered as the part of 1959 disaster.

See also

Typhoon Higos (2002)

References

External links
Japan Meteorological Agency
Joint Typhoon Warning Center 

1959 Pacific typhoon season
Typhoons in Japan
Typhoons in Russia
1959 disasters in Japan